The Men's Collegiate Lacrosse Association (MCLA) is a national organization of non-NCAA men's college lacrosse programs. The MCLA oversees game play and conducts national championships for over 200 teams in ten conferences throughout the United States and Canada.  The MCLA provides a governing structure much like the NCAA, with eligibility rules, All-Americans and a national tournament to decide national champions in both Divisions I and II.

The MCLA exists to provide a quality college lacrosse experience where varsity NCAA lacrosse does not exist.  On an individual scale, the MCLA provides rules and a structure that promotes "virtual varsity" lacrosse, or an experience paralleling that of NCAA programs. While the MCLA provides a high level of athletic competition, it is one of the few governing bodies that does not have a national GPA requirement for its athletes.  On a national scale, the MCLA provides the infrastructure to support a level playing field through eligibility rules and enforcement and the use of NCAA rules of play. The MCLA, an organization governing a mere 70 teams in 1997, has seen a rapid growth in affiliation as national interest in the sport of lacrosse continues to increase. As of the 2014 season, participation has increased to 210 teams.

History
The MCLA was formerly known as the US Lacrosse Men’s Division of Intercollegiate Associates (USL MDIA).  The MCLA was created by the MDIA Board of Directors and its creation was announced by US Lacrosse on August 24, 2006.

MCLA President John Paul was interviewed in a podcast on August 31, 2006. Information obtained from this interview includes:
 MDIA council will cease to exist
 MCLA will run its own national tournament and control its own budget
 MCLA membership will still sit on US Lacrosse boards and committees
 Team dues will be doubled from $500 to $1,000, the only significant impact to teams
 By-Laws are being rewritten to be ratified in January 2007
 Two new Vice President positions have been formed in the MCLA Executive Board and some paid positions will be created
 Long-term goals include a full-time paid League Executive Director who will answer to the Executive Board
 Executive Boards of MCLA and conferences will be insured, as will the national tournament, however, players and teams are responsible for their own individual insurance

Media coverage
The MCLA receives significant print coverage from US Lacrosse's Lacrosse Magazine and Inside Lacrosse. Inside Lacrosse acquired the license agreement from The Lax Mag in 2012 and devoted further coverage with weekly web editorial and podcasts. In efforts to promote the sport, the MCLA has also made strides to make lacrosse games available to a larger audience. In partnership with The Lacrosse Network (TLN) select games are available to viewers with streaming live feed. In the 2012 National Championship, 26 games from the tournament were broadcast live, exclusively on the MCLA tournament website while the Division II Finals, Division I Semifinals and Division I Championship were televised nationally on Fox College Sports. Additional coverage is occasionally featured on ESPN, LaxPower.com, various blogs and other news websites.

Milestones
Colorado State University holds the record for most MCLA championships won with six (1999, 2001, 2003, 2006, 2012 and 2013).  The Rams also hold the distinction of sending the first MCLA player into Major League Lacrosse when goaltender Alex Smith made the roster of Denver Outlaws from 2006-2010.  Brigham Young (1997, 2000, 2007, 2011) is second in MCLA history with four national titles.

The University of Michigan Varsity Club Lacrosse Team became the first team in MCLA history to complete a perfect season by defeating Chapman University in the national championship game on May 17, 2008. The Wolverines were able to repeat their success the following season by once again going undefeated and beating Chapman University in the national championship game on May 16, 2009.

In 2008, Brekan Kohlitz of the University of Michigan became the first MCLA player drafted to the MLL by the Washington Bayhawks.

In 2010, Connor Martin of Chapman University, a two-time All American and Offensive Player of the Year, was drafted by the Denver Outlaws. In his debut for the Outlaws, he scored a hat-trick and recorded an assist, earning him MLL Rookie of the Week. In 2014 Cam Holding became the second player ever to play in the MCLA to get drafted into the MLL by the Chesapeake Bayhawks. He currently plays for the Denver Outlaws and recently won a Gold medal in the 2014 FIL World Lacrosse Championship with team Canada.

The 2009-2011 MCLA Championships were held at Dick's Sporting Goods Park in Commerce City, Colorado.

In 2011, with the conclusion of the agreement between the MCLA and Dick’s Sporting Goods Park, the MCLA selected a new home for the National Championships. The 2012, 2013 MCLA Championships were relocated to a new venue; Sirrine Stadium in Greenville, South Carolina.

The 2014, MCLA National Championships were held in Southern California.  The opening two rounds were played at UC Irvine in Orange County and the semifinals and finals at Chapman University in Orange, CA. Two first-time champions were crowned, Colorado (DI) and Grand Valley State (DII).

MCLA Conferences
The MCLA separates teams into divisions (I or II) based upon performance history, and regional conferences.

Current conferences 
 Atlantic Lacrosse Conference (2021-present)
 Continental Lacrosse Conference (2019-present)
 Lone Star Alliance (1976-present)
 Pacific Northwest Collegiate Lacrosse League (1997-present)
 Rocky Mountain Lacrosse Conference (1976-present)
 SouthEastern Lacrosse Conference (1988-present)
 Southwestern Lacrosse Conference (2008-present)
 Upper Midwest Lacrosse Conference (1992-present)
 Western Collegiate Lacrosse League (1980-present)

Defunct conferences 

 Central Collegiate Lacrosse Association (1972-2018)
 Great Rivers Lacrosse Conference (2002-2017)
 Pioneer Collegiate Lacrosse League (1986-2017)

National Championship
The National Championships are held in May, featuring 16 qualifying teams from each division in a single-elimination contest to decide the National Champions. Each of the ten conference champions of the regular season receives an automatic bid to the National Tournament. The remaining six teams to qualify for the tournament are selected by an at large process by the MCLA tournament committee.

MCLA Division I Championship history

(called Division A through 2007)

*Postseason play contained top 8 teams

MCLA Division II Championship history
(called Division B thru 2007)

Executive committee

 Ken Lovic (President)
 Chris Malone
 Gary Podesta
 Pete Moosbrugger
 Jason Stockton
 Mike Annala

See also
 List of MCLA teams
 2015 MCLA Tournament
 NCAA Men's Lacrosse Championship
 US Lacrosse
 US Lacrosse Intercollegiate Associates

References

External links
 

College lacrosse leagues in the United States
College sports governing bodies in the United States
Lacrosse governing bodies of the United States
Lacrosse governing bodies of Canada
Sports organizations established in 2006
2006 establishments in the United States